LocalWiki is a collaborative project that aims to collect and open the world's local knowledge. This list of locations which have LocalWikis dedicated to them is necessarily incomplete.

Note:

References

LocalWikis
Content management systems
Wikis